Magdalena Jadwiga Boczarska (born 12 December 1978) is a Polish actress who has appeared in more than 25 feature films since 2001. She has twice received the IFFI Best Actor Award (Female): Silver Peacock Award, at the 41st and the 44th International Film Festival of India for her roles in Little Rose and In Hiding.

Early years
She was born in Krakow, where she graduated from Secondary School No. 21, attending an art class. In 2001, she graduated from the Ludwik Solski State Higher School of Theater in Krakow (Państwowa Wyższa Szkoła Teatralna im. Ludwika Solskiego w Krakowie).

Acting career
During her studies, she performed at the Theater Schools Festival in Łódź in the play Paradise Garden as a Woman, for which she received the Mikołaj Grabowski award.

After graduation, she made her debut on the stage of the New Theater in Łódź with the title role in the play The Water Hen (Kurka Wodna), directed by Łukasz Kos. Since 2003, she has been working at the National Theater in Warsaw. Since then, she has collaborated with Studio Buffo in Warsaw, Carrousel Theater in Berlin and Teatro Tatro in Slovakia.

Since 2005, she has appeared in popular TV series, both Polish and German. In 2007, she played the lead female role in the comedy duo Konecki and Saramonowicz Testosteron. After other roles in the duo's films, Lejdis and The Ideal Guy for My Girl, she received the lead role in the drama Różyczka directed by Jan Kidawa-Błoński. For her role in Różyczka, an agent of the Security Services, she received the award for the best actress at the 35th Polish Film Festival in Gdynia and the Silver Peacock statuette for the best actress at the 41st International Film Festival in Goa.

In 2017, she played the title role in the biopic Sztuka kochania. The story of Michalina Wisłocka, for which she was awarded the Eagle in the Best Female Lead Role category. In 2019, she played Maria Piłsudska, Józef Piłsudski's first wife, in the movie Piłsudski. For this role, she received the award for the best actress at the 44th Polish Film Festival in Gdynia.

Selected filmography

Filmography

Feature film roles 
 2006: Pod powierzchnią − as Ania
 2007: Testosteron − as Alicja
 2007: Futro − as Ania Witkowska, sister of Alicji
 2008: Lejdis − as Arletta,  Mark's lover
 2008: Putzfrau Undercover − as Irina
 2009: Idealny facet dla mojej dziewczyny − as Luna
 2009: Zero − as Kasjerka/Cashier
 2010: Różyczka − as Kamila „Różyczka” Sakowicz
 2011: Jak się pozbyć cellulitu − as Kornelia Matejko
 2012: Ixjana − as Marlena
 2012: Bejbi blues − as matka Natalii
 2013: W ukryciu − as Janina
 2014: Obywatel − as John's mother when younger
 2017: Sztuka kochania. Historia Michaliny Wisłockiej – as Michalina Wisłocka
 2017: Pod niemieckimi łóżkami (Unter deutschen Betten) – as Justyna Polańska
 2019: Piłsudski – as Maria Piłsudska 
 2019: Ukryta gra – as a barmaid

Television serials 
 2001: Klinika pod Wyrwigroszem − as a student
 2005–2006: Tango z aniołem − as Kama Jarczyńska
 2005: Pensjonat pod Różą − as Zosia Nowacka, Bartek's fiancé (odc. 42 i 43)
 2005: Na dobre i na złe − as Magda Hertman (odc. 221)
 2005: Abschnitt 40 − as Elena (odc. 23)
 2006: Dylematu 5 − as Katarzyna
 2007: Determinator − as Marzena Pietruszko, journalist
 2007–2008: Barwy szczęścia − as Patrycja, journalist w redakcji Marty
 2007: Miejsce zbrodni − as Agnieszka Sobinski (odc. 681)
 2008: Teraz albo nigdy! − as Ada Tulak
 2008–2009: 39 i pół − as Kicia, Catherine's secretary, then Darius'
 2009; 2011: Czas honoru − as Lola, a prisoner of Pawiak prison; Karolina Osmańska
 2009: Ihr Auftrag, Pater Castell − as Magdalena Lubinski (odc. 7)
 2012: Misja Afganistan − as journalist Marta (odc. 6 i 13)
 2013: Rodzinka.pl − as Iza (odc. 106)
 2013: Lekarze − as Olga Rojko
 2014: Prawo Agaty − as Julita Krzyszkiewicz (odc. 76)
 2014: Zbrodnia – as Agnieszka Lubczyńska
 2015: Mąż czy nie mąż – as Ewa, przyjaciółka Marty
 2016–2017: Druga szansa – as Sara Daymer
 2017: Der Usedom Krimi − as Małgorzata Kamińska (odc. 3 – Engelmacher)
 2018–2019: Pod powierzchnią – as Marta Gajewska
 2019: Zasada przyjemności – as Janina Zarychta (odc. 6)

Theatrical roles 
 2000: Letnicy as Sonia (PWST Kraków)
 2001: Rajski ogródek (PWST Kraków)
 2002: Kurka wodna as kurka wodna (Teatr Nowy w Łodzi)
 2003, 2010: Merlin. Inna historia as Virginea, czyli Viviana (Teatr Narodowy w Warszawie)
 2005: Tiramisu as Kreatywna (Laboratorium Dramatu)
 2008: HollyDay jak Holly (Teatr Studio im. Stanisława Ignacego Witkiewicza)
 2009: Boeing Boeing as Johanna (Studio Buffo)
 2010: O północy przybyłem do Widawy... czyli Opis obyczajów III (Teatr IMKA)
 2010: Wodzirej (Teatr IMKA)
 2011: Henryk Sienkiewicz – Greatest Hits (Teatr IMKA)
 2012: Histerie miłosne (Studio Buffo)
 2013: Kto się boi Virginii Woolf? as Żabcia (Teatr IMKA)
 2014: Medea as Medea (Teatr „Polonia”)

Awards and nominations 
 2001: nagroda dyrektora Teatru Nowego w Łodzi za rolę Kobiety w przedstawieniu Rajski ogródek Tadeusza Różewicza w reżyserii Pawła Miśkiewicza na XIX Festiwalu Szkół Teatralnych w Łodzi.
 2003: nagroda za debiut za rolę tytułową w przedstawieniu Kurka wodna Witkacego w Teatrze Nowym w Łodzi na XXVIII Opolskich Konfrontacjach Teatralnych w Opolu.
 2005: nagroda dla duetu aktorskiego (z Jarosławem Gajewskim) za rolę Viviany w przedstawieniu Merlin. Inna Historia Tadeusza Słobodzianka w Teatrze Narodowym w Warszawie oraz mała statuetka Wojciecha – nagroda dziennikarzy na XLV Kaliskich Spotkaniach Teatralnych w Kaliszu.
 2010: nagroda za pierwszoplanową rolę kobiecą w filmie Różyczka na 35. Festiwalu Polskich Filmów Fabularnych w Gdyni.
 2010: Srebrny Paw dla najlepszej aktorki za rolę w filmie Różyczka na Indyjskim Międzynarodowym Festiwalu Filmowym w Goa.
 2010: nominacja do nagrody im. Zbyszka Cybulskiego za rolę w filmie Różyczka.
 2011: nominacja do Orła w kategorii Najlepsza główna rola kobieca za rolę w filmie Różyczka.
 2011: nagroda aktorska za rolę w filmie Różyczka na Międzynarodowym Festiwalu Filmowym „Tiburon” w San Francisco.
 2012: nagroda aktorska za rolę w filmie Różyczka na Międzynarodowym Festiwalu Filmowym w Santo Domingo.
 2013: Srebrny Paw dla najlepszej aktorki za rolę w filmie W ukryciu na Indyjskim Międzynarodowym Festiwalu Filmowym w Goa.
 2017: statuetka Gwiazda Plejady w kategorii Osobowość roku podczas Wielkiej Gali Gwiazd Plejady.
 2017: Róża Gali w kategorii Film za rolę w filmie Sztuka kochania. Historia Michaliny Wisłockiej.
 2018: Orzeł w kategorii Najlepsza główna rola kobieca za rolę w filmie Sztuka kochania. Historia Michaliny Wisłockiej.
 2019: nagroda za pierwszoplanową rolę kobiecą w filmie Piłsudski na 44. Festiwalu Polskich Filmów Fabularnych w Gdyni.
 2020: Diamentowy Klaps Filmowy festiwalu Kino Letnie Sopot-Zakopane.

References

External links
 

1978 births
21st-century Polish actresses
IFFI Best Actor (Female) winners
Actresses from Kraków
Living people
Polish film actresses
Polish television actresses